Jochen Dinse (1941-2016) was an international speedway rider from East Germany.

Speedway career 
Dinse reached the final of the Speedway World Championship in the 1967 Individual Speedway World Championship.

He was six times champion of East Germany after winning the German Individual Speedway Championship and East German Longtrack Champion in 1974 and 1975.

World final appearances

Individual World Championship
 1967 –  London, Wembley Stadium – 16th – 0pts

World Pairs Championship
 1969 -  Stockholm (with Gerhard Uhlenbrock) - 6th - 9pts (1)

References 

1941 births
2016 deaths
German speedway riders